Avigdor Hameiri (Hebrew: אביגדור המאירי; September 16, 1890 – April 3, 1970) was a Hungarian-Israeli author.

Biography
Hameiri was born as Avigdor Menachem Feuerstein in 1890, in the village of Odavidhaza (near Munkatsch), Carpathian Ruthenia in Austria Hungary. Growing up with his grandfather instilled in him a love for the Hebrew language. Even though most of mainline Hungarian Jewry was still anti-Zionist, he had already developed an admiration for Zionism when he moved to Budapest.

He served in the Austro-Hungarian army along the Eastern front of World War I. Taken prisoner by the Russians during the Brusilov Offensive in 1916, he joined a group of Hebrew writers in Odessa after his release. With their support, he emigrated to Palestine in 1921, and fought in the 1948 War of Independence.

He recorded the events of his war service in his memoirs, The Great Madness (1929) and Hell on Earth (1932).  Alon Rachamimov writes that Hameiri's war stories "reveal the degree to which Jewish identification processes could be contextual, angst-ridden, and laden with contradictory tendencies.  The extent to which Hameiri was aware of his struggles regarding notions of 'loyalty,' 'fatherland,' and 'patriotism'...illuminate the complexities of collective identification among Habsburg Jews."
Gershon Shaked argues that Hameiri's anti-war stance is rooted in his Judaism.

His first book of poetry was published around 1912, while he was still living in Budapest. He published the Israeli State's first independent newspaper and helped to organize the worker's bank. Hameiri was the first poet to whom the title Israel's Poet Laureate was awarded. His books have been published in 12 languages.

He died in Israel on April 3, 1970.

Awards
 awarded by the Municipality of Holon (1962)
Israel Prize for literature (1968).

See also
 List of Israel Prize recipients

References

Bibliography
  - contains chapters on Uri Zvi Greenberg and Shaul Tchernichovsky as well.
 Rachamimov, A. "Collective Identifications and Austro-Hungarians Jews (1914-1918): The Contradictions and Travails of Avigdor Hameiri", in Laurence Cole and Daniel L. Unowsky (eds), The Limits of Loyalty: Imperial Symbolism, Popular Allegiances, and State Patriotism in the Late Habsburg Monarchy (Oxford, Berghahn Books, 2007), 178-197.

External links
 

Jewish Austrian writers
Hebrew-language writers
War writers
1970 deaths
Austro-Hungarian Jews
Jews in Mandatory Palestine
Israeli Jews
Burials at Kiryat Shaul Cemetery
Israel Prize in literature recipients
1890 births
Austro-Hungarian military personnel of World War I
Israeli people of the 1948 Arab–Israeli War
Hungarian emigrants to Mandatory Palestine
Jewish Hungarian writers
Jewish poets
20th-century Israeli poets
Israeli male poets
20th-century Hungarian poets
Hungarian male poets
People from Zakarpattia Oblast